Canoe Lake is a lake in Sudbury District, Ontario, Canada. The primary inflow, at the northeast, and outflow, at the southwest, is Yeo Creek.

References

Lakes of Sudbury District